"Thinking 'bout Somethin'" is a song written and performed by American pop/rock band Hanson. It is the first single from their fifth album, Shout It Out (2010). Lead vocals are provided by Taylor Hanson.

The song was released on iTunes in the U.S. on April 20, 2010 as an exclusive single before the release of the album.

A music video was released to promote the single. The video was directed by Todd Edwards, co-founder of Blue Yonder Films, and filmed by Kelly Kerr a Tulsa local. It was released for public viewing on their Myspace channel on April 15, 2010. Weird Al Yankovic has a cameo appearance as the tambourine player.
The filming of the music video was not done using a regular video camera but instead using the Canon EOS 7D dSLR and Nikon AI lenses. This was done to mimic vintage filming.

The video is also a pastiche of the "Shake a Tail Feather" number from the 1980 film The Blues Brothers.

Track listing
Written by Isaac Hanson, Taylor Hanson and Zac Hanson.

 "Thinking 'Bout Somethin'" (single version) – 3:45

References

External links
 

2009 songs
2010 singles
Hanson (band) songs
Songs written by Isaac Hanson
Songs written by Taylor Hanson
Songs written by Zac Hanson